Tariff is an unincorporated community in Roane County, West Virginia, United States. Tariff had a post office, which opened on February 10, 1890, and closed on October 1, 2005.

References

Unincorporated communities in Roane County, West Virginia
Unincorporated communities in West Virginia